This is a list of all the municipalities in the autonomous community of the Canary Islands, Spain.

Province of Tenerife

La Gomera
Agulo
Alajeró
Hermigua
San Sebastián de La Gomera
Vallehermoso
Valle Gran Rey

El Hierro
La Frontera
El Pinar
Valverde

La Palma
Barlovento
Breña Alta
Breña Baja
Fuencaliente de La Palma
Garafía
Los Llanos de Aridane
El Paso
Puntagorda
Puntallana
San Andrés y Sauces
Santa Cruz de La Palma
Tazacorte
Tijarafe
Villa de Mazo

Tenerife
Adeje
Arafo
Arico
Arona
Buenavista del Norte
Candelaria
Fasnia
Garachico
Granadilla de Abona
La Guancha
Guía de Isora
Güímar
Icod de los Vinos
La Matanza de Acentejo
La Orotava
Puerto de la Cruz
Los Realejos
El Rosario
San Cristóbal de La Laguna
San Juan de la Rambla
San Miguel de Abona
Santa Cruz de Tenerife
Santa Úrsula
Santiago del Teide
El Sauzal
Los Silos
Tacoronte
El Tanque
Tegueste
La Victoria de Acentejo
Vilaflor

Province of Las Palmas

Fuerteventura
 Antigua
 Betancuria
 La Oliva (includes Lobos Island)
 Pájara
 Puerto del Rosario
 Tuineje

Gran Canaria
Agaete
Agüimes
La Aldea de San Nicolás
Artenara
Arucas
Firgas
Gáldar
Ingenio
Las Palmas de Gran Canaria
Mogán
Moya
San Bartolomé de Tirajana
Sta. Brígida
Sta. Lucía de Tirajana
Santa María de Guía
Tejeda
Telde
Teror
Valleseco
Valsequillo
Vega de San Mateo

Lanzarote
Arrecife
Haría
San Bartolomé
Teguise (includes Isla de La Graciosa and four smaller islets, including Alegranza)
Tías
Tinajo
Yaiza

The rest of the islets are uninhabited, except La Graciosa, which contains a hamlet, Caleta de Sebo.

See also

Geography of Spain
List of cities in Spain
List of municipalities in Las Palmas

Canary Islands
Canary Islands-related lists